Asafpur is a block & village panchayat (Kasba) in Budaun district, Uttar Pradesh, India. Its block number is 0173. There are 84 villages under Asafpur block. According to 2011 Census of India, total number of houses in Asafpur is 28,395 and total population is 1,73,601 out of 92,682 are males and are 80,919 females.

References 

Villages in Budaun district
Blocks in Budaun District